Patricia Dowling may refer to:
 Patricia Dowling (Massachusetts politician) (born 1957)
 Patricia Dowling (New Hampshire politician) (born 1942)